Ebb Tide may refer to:

Ebb tide, the period between high tide and low tide when the sea level falls

Films and television
 Ebb Tide (1922 film), an American silent adventure film 
 Ebb Tide (1932 film), a British drama film 
 Ebb Tide (1937 film), an American Technicolor adventure film 
 "Ebb Tide" (The Wire), an episode of the TV series
 "Ebb Tide" (Penny Dreadful), an episode of the TV series

Music
 "Ebb Tide" (song), a 1953 song written by Carl Sigman and Robert Maxwell 
 Gettin' Up, also released as Ebb Tide, a 1967 album by Johnny "Hammond" Smith
 Nino and the Ebb Tides, or The Ebb Tides, an American doo-wop group

Other uses
 Ebb Tide (ship), a 1956 American vessel 
 The Ebb-Tide, an 1894 short novel by Robert Louis Stevenson

See also